I21 or I-21 may  refer to:

 , an Imperial Japanese Navy submarine completed in 1941 and sunk in 1943
 , named I-21 from 1924 to 1938, an Imperial Japanese Navy submarine completed in 1927 and scuttled in 1946, 
 Närke Regiment (1816–1892), a Swedish infantry regiment, split from the Närke-Värmland Regiment
 Kalmar Regiment (1893–1927), a Swedish infantry regiment
 Västernorrland Regiment (1928–1974), a Swedish infantry regiment